Estonian Safety Investigation Bureau (ESIB;  or OJK) is the transport safety agency of Estonia, headquartered in Tallinn. It is under the Ministry of Economic Affairs and Communications. It investigates aviation, maritime, and rail accidents.

It was established on 1 January 2012 by the merger of several accident investigation units.

Previously aviation accidents were investigated by the ministry's Aircraft Accident Investigation Commission (lennuõnnetuse põhjuste uurimiskomisjoni).

See also
 Estonian Civil Aviation Administration
 Estonian Maritime Administration

References

External links
 Estonian Safety Investigation Bureau
 Estonian Safety Investigation Bureau 

Aviation in Estonia
Organizations investigating aviation accidents and incidents
Rail accident investigators
Transport safety organizations
Government of Estonia
2012 establishments in Estonia
Organizations established in 2012